The Roșia Poieni copper mine is a large open pit copper mine in the centre of Romania, 90 km northwest of Alba Iulia and 484 km north of the capital, Bucharest. The access to the site is made through a south-west industrial haul road from Cornii Valley that crosses the National Road no. 74 Alba-Iulia – Zlatna – Abrud when entering Abrud and through a north industrial haul road from Mușca Valley that crosses the National Road no. 75 Câmpeni – Turda in Mușca village, Lupșa commune.

The Roșia Poieni deposit was developed between the 1950s and 1970s within the Abrud-Musca-Bucium area (the Golden Quadrilateral) from Apuseni Mountains of the Metaliferi Mountains. The mine produces around 11,000 tonnes of copper a year and the mineral deposit represents 65% of the total copper reserves in Romania. The mine is owned by CupruMin a state owned company.

Its decanting basin has totally erased the village of Geamana (de) 46° 19′ 41″ N, 23° 12′ 36″ E.

Geology 
Roșia Poieni represents the largest copper reserve in Romania and the second largest in Europe having estimated reserves of 1.5 billion tonnes of ore grading 0.36% copper. It is enclosed by eruptive sub-volcanoes Miocene rocks (micro-diorite or Fundoaia andesites).

The eruptive body comes in contact (through the tectonic breccia) with andesite necks (Poieni, Curmatura, Melciu, Piatra Tichileu, and Jgheabului Hills) and with sedimentary Cretaceous rocks.
The porphyry copper deposit is made up mainly of fine disseminations, nests and veinlets (0.02÷3 cm) of pyrite, chalcopyrite, and magnetite; gold included in the chalcopyrite and pyrite, and secondary minerals: bornite, covellite, chalcocite, sphalerite, galena, molybdenite, germanite, malachite, azurite and is developed in microdioritic rocks.

Ore processing 

The ore extracted from the open pit is crushed in a gyratory crusher after being transported and stored in the crushed ore storage facility located within the processing plant site.
The processing plant has a design capacity of 9 million tonnes extracted and processed per year, the process being made on 4 technological lines of 7,500 tonnes per day. The plant was launched between 1985 and 1987. The ore is subsequently processed through a classical processing flow, with a two-stage grinding phase in two autogenous mills and in two ball mills, followed by flotation, which is performed in pneumomechanical cells where the primary concentrate is obtained, which subsequently is flotated in cells of  where a copper concentrate is obtained with a content between 16.5 and 20% copper. The concentrate is thickened in sided thickeners and filtered through a pressure filter (Larox).

References

External links
 Official site
 Mindat.org page for the mine, including list of minerals found there

Copper mines in Romania
Open-pit mines